Kut Districtis a district of the Wasit Governorate, Iraq. Its seat is the city of Kut. 

Districts of Wasit Governorate